Grenfell is a  town in Weddin Shire in the Central West of New South Wales, Australia. It is close to Forbes, Cowra and Young. At the 2011 census, Grenfell had a population of 1,996. The town is served daily by connecting NSW TrainLink services from Sydney via Bathurst and Lithgow. Grenfell is approximately 5 hours from Sydney and 2 1/2 hours from Canberra.

History
In 1866, shepherd Cornelius O’Brien discovered a gold bearing quartz outcrop. Within some weeks, large parties of miners from the Lambing Flats and Forbes diggings arrived. Tents, bark huts and a business centre grew along the banks of Emu Creek. A few months later, Grenfell was proclaimed on January 1, 1867 after Gold Commissioner, John Granville Grenfell, who was wounded by bushrangers near Narromine on 7 December 1866. John Granville Grenfell was driving a coach at the time and refused to stop when bushrangers called him to. He was shot twice in the groin and died 24 hours later.

Grenfell was a goldmining town first known as Emu Creek and renamed in honour of John Grenfell, Gold Commissioner at Forbes, who had been killed in 1866 when bushrangers attacked a stagecoach on which he was travelling. "Weddin" Post Office opened on 3 December 1866 and was renamed "Grenfell" on 24 December the same year. By 1870-71 it was producing more gold than any other town in NSW. However, by the mid-1870s gold was in decline. During the First World War, manganese ore was mined near Grenfell for the production of ferromanganese.

Wheat was first grown in the district in 1871. In late October 1901, the railway from Koorawatha to Grenfell was officially opened. Unlike most Australian country towns Grenfell has a main street which bends.

The town's rugby league team competed for the Maher Cup.

In June 2007, the Spirit of the Bush Concert was held on the sporting fields. Acts included the organiser and Australian of the Year Lee Kernaghan, local and international star Steve Forde & the Flange, Adam Brand, Leo Sayer, Diesel, and The McClymonts.

Population
In the 2016 Census, there were 2,573 people in Grenfell. 86.5% of people were born in Australia and 91.7% of people spoke only English at home. The most common responses for religion were Anglican 27.1%, Catholic 25.6%, No Religion 17.9% and Uniting Church 8.5%.

Grenfell railway station

The Grenfell railway station is a heritage listed site.

Attractions

 Chrysler Car Museum
 Ochre Arch Farm Tours
 Iandra Castle
 Ben Halls Cave
 Weddin Mountains National Park
 Seaton's Farm
 Bird Watching and Bird Trails
 Endemic Garden
 Wallangreen Sculpture Garden
 Grenfell Art Gallery
 Patina Gallery
 Grenfell Museum
 Historic Railway Station
 Historic Main Street and George Street
 Henry Lawson birthplace and statues
 O'Brians Hill
 The Big Gold Pick and Pan
 Sporting Hall of Fame

Major events
A full calendar of events can be found here or a list of the major events can be found below.
 Australia Day – January
 Grenfell Rodeo - March (cancelled 2021)
 ANZAC Day Commemorations – April
 Grenfell Picnic Races – April
 Henry Lawson Festival of Arts – June (cancelled 2021 & 2020, due to covid-19)
 Grenfell Show – August/September (cancelled 2020)
 Caragabal Sheep Races – September
 Jockey Club Races – September
 Weddin Mountain Muster – September/October
 Combined Services Club Christmas Carnival - December
 Carols by Candlelight – December

Climate

Typical of the South West Slopes, Grenfell features a stark difference in temperatures and sky conditions between summer and winter. Summers are hot and dry with long sunny periods interspersed with severe thunderstorms, whereas winters are cool and rainy with many overcast days. Sleet and rarely snow can fall in the winter months, despite the low altitude.

Rainfall records commenced in 1885, but those of temperature not until 1907. Extreme temperature records are found only from 1965 onwards.

The villages of Weddin Shire

 Greenethorpe – George Greene built Iandra Castle between 1886 and 1908 and established Australia's first share farming agreement. He was instrumental in providing a rail link from Koorawatha to transport wheat. Greenethorpe grew as a support town for the rural population and was named in honour of George Greene.
 Caragabal – The town developed as a staging post and watering hole for coach drivers and horses on the run between West Wyalong and Grenfell. Caragabal was once a thriving hub for railway, stock and grain. The town has an 18-hole golf course, tennis courts, bowling club and hotel.
 Quandialla – Quandialla is the aboriginal word for spiny anteater. Founded in 1914 as a railway town, Quandialla has a population of 200 people. Services in the village include the historic hotel, general store, swimming pool, and bowling club. Quandialla was the setting for the film 1915.

Fossils

Grenfell is an important centre for fossils from the Devonian period which are found in many surrounding outcrops of the Hunter Siltstone geological formation.

Notable people
Notable people from or who have lived in Grenfell include:
Sam Myers, Professional Rugby Sevens Player
 Henry Lawson, poet
 Jan Lehane, tennis player
 Stan McCabe, cricketer
 Reggie McNamara, cyclist

Education
Grenfell Preschool & Long Day Care Centre
Grenfell Public School
St Joseph's Primary School - Grenfell 
Henry Lawson High School
Tafe NSW - Grenfell Campus

Health Services
Grenfell Hospital & Multipurpose Health Service
Community Health
Main Street Medical Services 
Medcirc
Grenfell Family Dentist
Home Care Services 
Meals on Wheels
Weddin Community Transport
Bowen and Physiotherapy 
Chiropractic Life
Grenfell Pharmacy

References

External links

 Grenfell's web site

 
Towns in New South Wales
Towns in the Central West (New South Wales)
Weddin Shire
Mining towns in New South Wales